The finals and the qualifying heats of the Men's 400 metres Freestyle event at the 1997 FINA Short Course World Championships were held on the second day of the competition, on Friday 18 April 1997 in Gothenburg, Sweden.

Finals

Qualifying heats

See also
1996 Men's Olympic Games 400m Freestyle
1997 Men's European LC Championships 400m Freestyle

References
 Results

F